Eburiini is a tribe of beetles in the subfamily Cerambycinae, synonymous with the tribe Heteropsini Lacordaire, 1868, containing the following genera:

 Beraba Martins, 1997
 Cupanoscelis Gounelle, 1909
 Dioridium Zajciw, 1961
 Eburella Monné & Martins, 1973
 Eburia Lacordaire, 1830
 Eburiaca Martins, 2000
 Eburiola Thomson, 1864
 Eburodacrys White, 1853
 Eburodacrystola Melzer, 1928
 Eburostola Tippmann, 1960
 Eleutho Thomson, 1864
 Erosida Thomson, 1861
 Heterops Blanchard, 1842
 Neoeburia Galileo & Martins, 2006
 Pantomallus Lacordaire, 1868
 = Opades Lacordaire, 1868 syn. nov.
 Pantomallus costipennis (Buquet, 1844) comb. nov.
 Pantomallus fuligineus Bates, 1872 resurrection of the original combination
 Pantomallus sordidus Burmeister, 1865 comb. nov.
 Pronuba Thomson, 1861
 Quiacaua Martins, 1997
 Simplexeburia Martins & Galileo, 2010
 Solangella Martins, 1997
 Styliceps Lacordaire, 1868
 Susuacanga Martins, 1997
 Tumiditarsus Zajciw, 1961
 Uncieburia Martins, 1997
 Volxemia Lameere, 1884

References

 
Cerambycinae